In quantum computing, a quantum register is a system comprising multiple qubits.  It is the quantum analogue of the classical processor register.  Quantum computers perform calculations by manipulating qubits within a quantum register.

Definition 

It is usually assumed that the register consists of qubits. It is also generally assumed that registers are not density matrices, but that they are pure, although the definition of "register" can be extended to density matrices.

An  size quantum register is a quantum system comprising  pure qubits. 

The Hilbert space, in which the data is stored in a quantum register is given by  where  is the tensor product.

The number of dimensions of the Hilbert spaces depend on what kind of quantum systems the register is composed of. Qubits are 2-dimensional complex spaces, while qutrits are 3-dimensional complex spaces, et.c. For a register composed of N number of d-dimensional (or d-level) quantum systems we have the Hilbert space 

The registers quantum state can in the bra-ket notation be written  The values  are probability amplitudes. Because of the Born rule and the 2nd axiom of probability theory,  so the possible state space of the register is the surface of the unit sphere in 

Examples: 
 The quantum state vector of a 5-qubit register is a unit vector in 
 A register of four qutrits similarly is a unit vector in

Quantum vs. classical register 
First, there's a conceptual difference between the quantum and classical register.
An  size classical register refers to an array of  flip flops. An  size quantum register is merely a collection of  qubits.

Moreover, while an  size classical register is able to store a single value of the  possibilities spanned by  classical pure bits, a quantum register is able to store all  possibilities spanned by quantum pure qubits at the same time.

For example, consider a 2-bit-wide register.  A classical register is able to store only one of the possible values represented by 2 bits -  accordingly.

References

Further reading
 

Quantum information science